Hurstbourne railway station served the village of Hurstbourne Priors in Hampshire, England. It was on the London and South Western Railway's West of England Main Line and was also the junction for the Fullerton to Hurstbourne Line. Trains for the Fullerton line started and stopped at Whitchurch, the next station to the east on the main line.

History
Passenger services were withdrawn on the Fullerton to Hurstbourne line in 1931, but Hurstbourne remained open for stopping services between Basingstoke and Andover until it closed in 1964. The site is now occupied by a scrap metal dealer.

References

External links
 Hurstbourne station on navigable 1947 O. S. map

Former London and South Western Railway stations
Railway stations in Great Britain opened in 1882
Railway stations in Great Britain closed in 1964
Disused railway stations in Hampshire
Beeching closures in England